, formerly Radio Kanto Co, Ltd. is a local AM radio station in Yokohama, Kanagawa Prefecture, Japan.

Offices

The Headquarters: 5-85, Chōjamachi, Naka-ku, Yokohama, Kanagawa Prefecture, Japan
Tokyo Office: 2-2-1, Azabudai, Minato, Tokyo, Japan

Broadcasting
Station: Yokohama
Call sign: JORF
Frequency: 1,422 kHz
Output: 50 kW
Transmitter: Harris DX-50
Station: Odawara
Call sign: JORL
Frequency: 1,485 kHz
Output: 1 kW

External links 
 

Radio stations established in 1958
Mass media in Yokohama
Radio in Japan
Companies based in Yokohama
Nippon TV